Halvfarhøe is a mountain in Dovre Municipality in Innlandet county, Norway. The mountain is surrounded by several other notable mountains including Gråhøe to the east, Falketind and Blåberget to the north, and Storhøe and Fokstuguhøi to the west.

See also
List of mountains of Norway

References

Dovre
Mountains of Innlandet